Peter Cummings may be:

 Peter Cummings (architect) (1879–1957), Russian-English architect
 Peter T. Cummings (born 1954), Australian-American chemical engineer

See also
 Peter Cummins (born 1931), Australian actor